Josefina López Pérez (born 29 July 1969) is a Spanish former taekwondo practitioner. She won the bronze medal at the 1988 Summer Olympics, where taekwondo was a demonstration sport, in the bantamweight event. At the World Taekwondo Championships she won the silver medal in 1987 and the bronze medal in 1991. At the European Taekwondo Championships she won the silver medal in 1992 and the bronze medal in 1988.

References

External links
 

1969 births
Living people
Spanish female taekwondo practitioners
Sportspeople from Sabadell
Olympic taekwondo practitioners of Spain
Taekwondo practitioners at the 1988 Summer Olympics
Taekwondo practitioners at the 1992 Summer Olympics
World Taekwondo Championships medalists
20th-century Spanish women
21st-century Spanish women